A bright-line rule (or bright-line test) is a clearly defined rule or standard, composed of objective factors, which leaves little or no room for varying interpretation. The purpose of a bright-line rule is to produce predictable and consistent results in its application. The term "bright-line" in this sense generally occurs in a  legal context.

Bright-line rules are usually standards established by courts in legal precedent or by legislatures in statutory provisions. The US Supreme Court often contrasts bright-line rules with their opposite: balancing tests (or "fine line testing"), where a result depends on weighing several factors—which could lead to inconsistent application of law or reduce objectivity.

Debate in the US
In the United States, there is much scholarly legal debate between those favoring bright-line rules and those favoring balancing tests. While some legal scholars, such as former Supreme Court Justice Antonin Scalia, have expressed a strong preference for bright-line rules, critics often argue that bright-line rules are overly simplistic and can lead to harsh and unjust results. Supreme Court Justice Stephen Breyer noted that there are circumstances in which the application of bright-line rules would be inappropriate, stating that "no single set of legal rules can ever capture the ever changing complexity of human life."

Examples
Miranda v. Arizona (1966) may be considered establishing a bright-line rule. The majority opinion in that case required law enforcement agents to give a criminal suspect what is now known as a Miranda warning of their “Miranda” rights when the suspect is in custody, and when the suspect is about to be interrogated.

New Zealand - Taxation (Bright-line Test for Residential Land) Act 2015 
The Taxation (Bright-line Test for Residential Land) Act 2015 is a form of Capital Gains Tax legislation in New Zealand. When it was introduced a bright-line test was described as, "a term used in law for a clearly-defined rule or standard, using objective factors, which is designed to produce predictable and consistent results."

Notable cases containing bright-line rules
 Goldberg v. Kelly (1970) ruled that the due process requirement requires an evidentiary hearing before a recipient of certain government welfare benefits can be deprived of such benefits.
 Michigan v. Summers (1981) held that for Fourth Amendment purposes, a warrant to search for contraband founded on probable cause implicitly carries with it the limited authority to detain the occupants of the premises while a proper search is conducted.
 SEC v. Chenery Corp., 
 Aguilar v. Texas, 
 Miranda v. Arizona, 
 Katko v. Briney, 183 N.W.2d 657 (Iowa 1971)
 Heckler v. Campbell, 
 Bowen v. Georgetown University Hospital, 
 Evans v. the United Kingdom
 Kyllo v. United States, 
 Arizona v. Gant,

Notable cases not following bright-line rules
 District of Columbia v. Heller

References

External links

 Language Log Discussion of the phrase, with examples and history

American legal terminology